Gregg Polsky is an American lawyer currently the Francis Schackelford Professor of Taxation Law at University of Georgia.

References

Year of birth missing (living people)
Living people
University of Georgia faculty
American lawyers
Florida Atlantic University alumni
University of Florida alumni